The Personals is a 1982 romantic comedy written and directed by Peter Markle. It was shot in Minneapolis. The film was picked up for distribution by Roger Corman's New World Pictures.

Production
Writer/director Peter Markle's first feature film, it was made with a SAG cast recruited from the Guthrie Theater and a nonunion crew. Principal photography was May–September 1980, with additional takes and pickups through December and continuing into August 1981. It was shot on 16 mm, and blown up to 35 mm for theater screenings.

It was filmed in and around Minneapolis, including such landmarks as the Lake of the Isles, Bde Maka Ska, and the Minneapolis Institute of Art. As a low budget, independent film, the homes of director Markle, writer Wells, and actor Schoppert were used as filming locations as well.

Plot

A man whose wife has left him starts dating again by placing ads in newspaper personal columns.  He gets some letters and he dates around the Minnesota area.

Cast

Reception 
The film won the Best First Feature Award at the Houston International Film Festival.

New World Pictures distributed the film nationally, and it ran for twelve weeks at St. Louis Park's Cooper Theater. It also received generally positive reviews: The Washington Post called it a "minor but admirably polished and attractive low-budget gem," and Variety said that the "story really isn't all the profound, but it's told with sincerity and humor, full of likeable, decent people dealing with familiar problems with wigging out." Variety also commended the cast "making their feature film debut ... so natural it could embarrass some Hollywood acting schools." Multiple reviewers appreciated Minneapolis as a fresh setting for filmmaking.

Its rental tally was $2 million (equivalent to $ million in ).

See also
Personal Column
Sea of Love

References

External links

1982 films
Films shot in Minnesota
Films set in Minneapolis
1982 romantic comedy films
Films directed by Peter Markle
1982 directorial debut films
American romantic comedy films
1980s English-language films
1980s American films